The Fryer Hotel is a historic two-story hotel building in Deweyville, Utah. It was built in 1902-1903 by Robert C. Fryer, and designed in the Greek Revival and Victorian Eclectic styles. Fryer was an immigrant from England who married Bashua Dorcas Kingsbury, lived in Salt Lake City prior to moving to Deweyville, and eventually returned there in 1913. It has been listed on the National Register of Historic Places since April 7, 1988.

References

National Register of Historic Places in Box Elder County, Utah
Greek Revival architecture in Utah
Victorian architecture in Utah
Hotel buildings completed in 1902
Hotel buildings on the National Register of Historic Places in Utah
1902 establishments in Utah